, literally "parent-and-child donburi", is a donburi, or Japanese rice bowl dish, in which chicken, egg, sliced scallion (or sometimes regular onions), and other ingredients are all simmered together in a kind of soup that is made with soy sauce and stock, and then served on top of a large bowl of rice. The name of the dish is a poetic reflection of both chicken and egg being used in the dish.

History
The origins of the dish are unknown. The earliest written mention of the terms "oyako" and "don" in combination is in a newspaper advertisement for a restaurant in Kobe in 1884. The advertisement mentions dishes named oyakojōdon, oyakonamidon and oyakochūdon, possibly referring to different sizes.

Variations
Several other Japanese dishes pun on the parent-and-child theme of oyakodon. , literally "stranger bowl", is otherwise identical but replaces the chicken with beef or pork.

See also
Gyūdon, beef on rice
Katsudon, pork cutlets on rice
"Mother and Child Reunion", a Paul Simon song that takes its title from a similar chicken and egg dish

References

 Tsuji, Shizuo (1980). Japanese Cooking: A Simple Art. New York: Kodansha International/USA. .

External links 

Donburi
Japanese rice dishes
Japanese egg dishes
Japanese chicken dishes
Chicken and rice dishes